Valley of the Sasquatch (also known as Hunting Grounds) is a 2015 American horror film written and directed by John Portanova and starring Miles Joris-Peyrafitte, Jason Vail, David Saucedo, D'Angelo Midili, and Bill Oberst Jr.  as a group of hunters who encounter a family of Sasquatches. It premiered in February 2015 at the Nevermore Film Festival.

Plot 

After his wife dies, Roger forces his son Michael to go on a hunting trip in rural Washington with a family friend and Roger's brother-in-law.  When they reach their cabin, they find it has been broken into and is a mess.  Thinking nothing of it, Roger and the others enter the nearby woods, where they encounter a family of hostile Sasquatches.

Cast 
 Miles Joris-Peyrafitte as Michael Crew
 Jason Vail as Roger Crew
 David Saucedo as Sergio Guerrero
 D'Angelo Midili as Will Marx
 Bill Oberst Jr. as Bauman
 Connor Conrad as the beast

Production 

Valley of the Sasquatch is Portanova's debut.  Portanova, a Washington native and Bigfoot fan, included local stories from Washington in the screenplay.  Shooting took place entirely on location, including at Snoqualmie Pass and Meany Lodge, over 23 days.  The monster suit was designed by Doug Hudson.

Release

Valley of the Sasquatch premiered on February 20, 2015, at the Nevermore Film Festival.

Critical response
Ken W. Hanley of Fangoria rated it 2/4 stars and, though he praised Portanova's skill at directing and Hudson's special effects, wrote the writing is too generic.  Mark L. Miller of Ain't It Cool News wrote the film fulfills all the criteria necessary for a good Bigfoot film: a new story, good action scenes, and a good costume.  Ari Drew of Dread Central rated it 2.5/5 stars and wrote, "While Valley of the Sasquatch does not necessarily bring on the horror in a major or fresh way, it is at times a very effectively atmospheric film with some interesting ideas behind it."  Michael Juvinall of Horror Society rated 4.5/5 stars and called it "the best this subgenre has to offer".

Mike Wilson of Bloody Disgusting gave the film a mixed review, writing, "
Portanova certainly knows his way around with the camera, and the actors, for the most part, gave the effort necessary. The film just falters at attempting to mix a human drama with Bigfoot, being let down by the writing. Rough as it is, it’s still worthwhile to see it if you’re a fan of Bigfoot films, and you temper your expectations."

References

External links 
 
 
 

2015 films
2015 horror films
American natural horror films
Bigfoot films
Films set in Washington (state)
Films shot in Washington (state)
2015 directorial debut films
2010s English-language films
2010s American films